Hapalodectes (literal translation 'soft biter'; from   ('soft, tender') and   ('biter')) is an extinct genus of otter-like mesonychids from the Late Paleocene to Early Eocene, some 55million years ago. Although the first fossils were found in the Eocene strata of Wyoming, the genus originated in Mongolia, as the oldest species is H. dux, which was found in Late Paleocene strata in the Naran Bulak Formation.

The genus was once suggested to be related to the Archaeoceti, such as Pakicetus, due to numerous similarities between the skull and tooth anatomies of the two genera. Now, however, Hapalodectes and other mesonychians are thought to be related to basal artiodactyls, while the Archaeoceti are now determined to be descended from more derived artiodactyls, like Indohyus, which are related to hippopotamuses and anthracotheres.

Species
Genus Hapalodectes
 H. anthracinus Zhou et Gingerich, 1991
 H. dux Lopatin, 1999
 H. hetangensis Ting et Li, 1987
 H. huanghaiensis Tong et Wang, 2006
 H. leptognathus Osborn et Wortman, 1892
 H. lopatini Solé et al., 2017
 H. paleocenus Beard et al., 2010
 H. serus Matthew et Granger, 1925

References

Mesonychids
Paleocene mammals
Eocene mammals
Ypresian extinctions
Paleogene mammals of Asia
Prehistoric placental genera